Pexelizumab is a drug designed to reduce side effects of coronary artery bypass grafting and angioplasty, among other types of cardiac surgery. It is a single chain variable fragment of a monoclonal antibody targeted against component 5 of the complement system.

Current status 

Alexion, the developer of pexelizumab, stopped development when the phase 3 trial indicated the heart-attack drug is no better than placebo.

References 

Monoclonal antibodies
Abandoned drugs